John Helton (born 23 May 1947) is a former defensive tackle for the Calgary Stampeders from 1969–1978 and the Winnipeg Blue Bombers from 1979-1982 of the Canadian Football League.

High school and college
John Helton graduated from Captain Jack High School in Mount Union, Pennsylvania. Helton was selected in the seventh round of the 1969 NFL Draft by the Buffalo Bills after a stellar career at Arizona State University, but opted to go to Canada.

CFL
John Helton was a CFL-All Star 10 times in 14 years of play at defensive tackle. Helton won a Grey Cup with the Stampeders in 1971.  He also lost the 58th Grey Cup in 1970 to the Montreal Alouettes on a very muddy field.

Honors
Helton was inducted into the Canadian Football Hall of Fame in 1986. He was inducted into the Alberta Sports Hall of Fame and Museum in 1993. In November 2006, Helton was voted one of the CFL's Top 50 players (#12) of the league's modern era by Canadian sports network The Sports Network/TSN, no defensive lineman being ahead of him.

References

External links

1947 births
Living people
American players of Canadian football
Arizona State Sun Devils football players
Calgary Stampeders players
Canadian football defensive linemen
Canadian Football Hall of Fame inductees
Canadian Football League Most Outstanding Defensive Player Award winners
Winnipeg Blue Bombers players